Rita Bernardini (born 27 December 1952) is an Italian politician.

Born in Rome, Rita Bernardini was the secretary of the Italian Radicals from November 2013 to 2015. She had already been secretary between 2006 and 2008. She was elected deputy at the Italian parliament in 2008 with the Democratic Party.

References

External links 

1952 births
Living people
Politicians from Rome
Democratic Party (Italy) politicians
Italian Radicals politicians
Deputies of Legislature XVI of Italy
21st-century Italian women politicians
Women members of the Chamber of Deputies (Italy)